Real Club Deportivo de La Coruña, commonly known as Deportivo La Coruña, Deportivo or simply Dépor, is a professional football club based in the city of A Coruña, Galicia, Spain. They currently play in the Primera División RFEF – Group 1, the third tier of the football league pyramid in Spain.

Founded in 1906 as Club Deportivo de la Sala Calvet by Federico Fernández-Amor Calvet, Deportivo have won the league title once, in the 1999–2000 season, and finished as runner-up on five occasions. The club have also won the Spanish Cup twice (1994–95 and 2001–02), and three Spanish Super Cups. The Blue and Whites were a regular fixture in the top positions of La Liga for the best part of 20 years, from 1991 to 2010, finishing in the top half of the table in 16 out of 19 seasons, and are ranked 12th in the all-time La Liga table. As a result, the club was a regular participant in European competitions, playing in the UEFA Champions League for five consecutive seasons between 2000–01 and 2004–05, reaching the quarterfinals twice and reaching the semi-finals in the 2003–04 season.

Deportivo have played their home games at the 32,490-capacity Riazor since 1944, when the stadium was built. Their traditional home kit consists of blue and white striped shirts with blue shorts and socks. The club has a long-standing rivalry with Celta Vigo, and matches between the two sides are known as the Galician derby.

History

Foundation and first steps

Unlike what happened in most of the Iberian Peninsula, football did not reach the city of A Coruña through the English, instead, it was introduced by José María Abalo, a youngster who had returned to his hometown after studying in England. The game gained rapid popularity and several teams were formed on an informal basis.

In December 1906, members of Sala Calvet gymnasium formed Deportivo de La Coruña, naming Luis Cornide as the first president. In May 1907, Alfonso XIII of Spain granted the club the "Real" ("royal") denomination. Dépor started playing at Corral de la Gaiteira ("Piper's Yard"), but soon moved to Old Riazor, a new ground near the Riazor beach.

The team played friendly matches regularly and competed in local leagues, but failed to achieve success in the Copa del Rey in its early years.

In 1920, the Olympics in Antwerp saw the debut of the Spanish national team. A good run for the Spanish side increased football's popularity, and as a result, many teams gained professional status, and a league competition was formed and planned for the 1928–29 season.

1928–1947: Segunda División and the top flight
In 1928, Dépor failed to qualify for the first ever Primera División, instead competing in the Segunda División, where it finished eighth out of ten. The team kept battling over the next few years in a division that was soon to undergo many structural and geographical changes. In 1932, in the Cup, Dépor defeated Real Madrid, which had gone unbeaten through the entire season in the league.

In 1936, the Spanish Civil War broke out, forcing the abandonment of all official competitions until the 1939–40 season. That year, The Herculeans qualified for the promotion stage. The final game was against archrivals Celta de Vigo, who were fighting to avoid relegation. Celta won 1–0 and remained in the top flight as Depor's hopes of promotion were denied. The following season, however, the club reached the promotion play-offs again, this time beating Murcia 2–1 to earn promotion to La Liga for the first time in the team's history.

The first season in the top flight saw the club finish fourth. However, the club declined in the next few seasons, finishing ninth, 12th and, in 1944–45, 14th, resulting in relegation. Instant promotion was achieved the following year, but Dépor were relegated again at the end of the 1946–47 season. Nonetheless, the team gained instant promotion in 1947–48.

This decade saw Depor's entrance to the top flight, so the club decided to build a new ground, Riazor, which remains their home today. It was opened on 28 October 1944 with a league game against Valencia. In this era, the key player of the team was Juan Acuña, the club's goalkeeper. "Xanetas", as he was known by locals, earned four Zamora Trophies between 1942 and 1951, making him the second-most decorated keeper in the Spanish league.

1948–1957: The "Golden Decade"
The club ended the 1948–49 season in tenth place. The next season would see their first major achievement in the league—Dépor finished as runners-up just one point behind Atlético Madrid under the management of Argentinian Alejandro Scopelli, who brought to the club a group of South American players such as Julio Corcuera, Oswaldo García, Rafael Franco and Dagoberto Moll, a group that made the team more competitive and able to remain top flight status for nine consecutive seasons until 1957. It was a great period for the club, as honoured managers like Helenio Herrera and players as Pahiño and local Luis Suárez (the only Spanish player to receive the Golden Ball honour) played at the Riazor.

1958–1973: "Elevator Team"

After nine seasons of first-tier football in Spain, the team was relegated to the Segunda División in 1957 and stayed there for five seasons until 1962, when they were promoted into the top flight. This started a yo-yo era that led the club to be known as the "elevator team"—promotions were achieved in 1962, 1964, 1966, 1968 and 1971, yet subsequent relegations occurred during 1963, 1965, 1967, 1970 and 1973.

Dépor had one of the best youth systems at the time in Spain, as youngsters including Amancio Amaro, Severino Reija, José Luis Veloso and Jaime Blanco began their careers at the Riazor, in the future to become regular fixtures on the Spanish national team. Still more, including Luis Suárez, went on to play for larger clubs in Spain and Europe. However, the difficult financial situation of the club led to the forced sales of these players, and the team could not consolidate themselves in the top flight. This "yo-yo era" ended with relegation from the Primera División in 1973.

1974–1988: Dark times
After being relegated in 1973, the team struggled in the Second División, failing to avoid another relegation and falling to the third tier (Tercera División) for the first time in their history. However, Dépor gained instant promotion and established themselves in the second tier for the rest of the decade. In 1980, Dépor were again relegated to the newly created Segunda División B, the third tier, again for the second time in their history. Again, however, the drop was short-lived as the team gained promotion the following season. Notably, Dépor were relegated and promoted along with arch-rivals Celta de Vigo, who played during the 1980–81 season the most attended games ever in Spain's third tier.

The club continued to play in the Second División, showing little chance of being promoted back to the top flight. In the 1987–88 season, Dépor struggled and only avoided relegation after Vicente Celeiro scored a goal during added time against Racing de Santander in the last game of the season. This is often regarded as the end of the club's dark times and the beginning of a new era.

During this period, the club was heavily affected by financial difficulties and internal troubles with managers being sacked almost every year. In the summer of 1988, an open and popular club assembly chose a new board of directors headed by Augusto César Lendoiro. Deportivo had a debt estimated at 600 million pesetas, had been out of the top flight for 15 years and lacked established structures at economic and sporting level.

1989–1998: Resurgence and "Súper Dépor"

Arsenio Iglesias, a former Deportivo player and manager, was again appointed as manager in the 1988–89 season. Dépor had a lengthy run in the Copa del Rey, though ultimately falling in the semi-finals to Real Valladolid. The next year, the team competed well in the league and qualified for the promotion play-offs, but expectations were denied again, this time by Tenerife. The 1990–91 season saw Dépor finishing as runners-up, finally achieving promotion to La Liga after an 18-year absence. Additionally, the club's finances began to improve and social support increased, especially amongst youth groups.

The 1991–92 season, the team's first back in the top flight, saw Dépor struggle, and they were forced to take part in the relegation play-off, beating Real Betis in a two-legged round. With Arsenio Iglesias in his fourth spell as manager and experienced players added to the side, including López Rekarte, Paco Liaño, Claudio Barragán, José Luis Ribera, Adolfo Aldana, Donato (most of them veterans being former players of great teams like Real Madrid, Barcelona or Atlético Madrid), along with promising youngsters such as local player Fran and Brazilians Bebeto and Mauro Silva, upgraded the team's level.

The 1992–93 Deportivo squad experienced a resurgent season, placing in top positions all season and ultimately finishing third after champions Barcelona and runners-up Real Madrid, respectively, thus qualifying for European competition for the first time in their history. That year, the club also provided La Liga's Pichichi Trophy winner, Bebeto, and its Zamora Trophy winner, Paco Liaño. Additionally, Dépor made a historic comeback against Real Madrid at Riazor, trailing 0–2 at half-time but winning the game 3–2 and starting a run of 18 seasons to Los Blancos without a win at A Coruña.

In 1993–94, Dépor had another fantastic season, leading the table for the majority of the year and coming to the last matchday in first to face mid-table Valencia, knowing a win would ensure the first league title in club history. The game was very close, but near its end, Valencia's Serer conceded a penalty on Nando. Regular penalty-taker Donato had been substituted, so Serbian defender Miroslav Đukić took it, but Valencia keeper González caught the ball; Deportivo saw their possible league title denied. After the frustration passed, the fans nonetheless recognised the impressive season the club had: Paco Liaño earned his second Zamora Trophy after conceding just 18 goals in 38 games, and Dépor made its debut in European competitions with the UEFA Cup, beating Aalborg BK and Aston Villa but losing to Eintracht Frankfurt in the round of 16.

The 1994–95 season began with manager Arsenio Iglesias stating he would leave the club after the end of the year, though Dépor made another great campaign finishing again as runners-up, this time to Real Madrid. In that season's UEFA Cup, Deportivo were beaten again in the round of 16 by a German club, this time by Borussia Dortmund 2–3 on aggregate. Depor had won the first leg at home 1–0, and Dortmund equalized in the second leg to send the match into extra time. Now in extra time, Depor scored a second goal to put the match at 2–1, but with five minutes remaining, Dortmund scored two goals in two minutes to win the series. Despite this tough defeat, the season still hid a great surprise for the club, as Dépor made a fantastic run in Copa del Rey and reached the final for the first time in club history, against Valencia. On 24 June 1995, at the Santiago Bernabéu, the final was levelled 1–1 when referee García-Aranda suspended the game at the 80th minute due to heavy rain and a hailstorm. It was decided that the game would resume three days later. Two minutes after the match resumed, Alfredo Santaelena scored a header, which proved to be the winning goal that handed Depor their first ever major title.

The 1995–96 season was an average one for Depor; they finished ninth in the league table, but reached the semi-finals of the Cup Winners' Cup, losing to eventual champions PSG. The 1997–98 season was very disappointing. The team only finished twelfth in the league table, failing to qualify for European competitions, and were eliminated in the first round of the UEFA Cup by French club AJ Auxerre.

1999–2007: La Liga title, "El Centenariazo", and European Glory days 

In 1999–2000, Deportivo, managed by Javier Irureta and with players like Noureddine Naybet, Diego Tristán, Djalminha, Fran, Roy Makaay and Mauro Silva, finally won their first La Liga title, five points ahead of Barcelona and Valencia. With this title, La Coruña became the second-smallest Spanish city with a population of approximately 250,000, behind San Sebastián (home of Real Sociedad), to have ever won La Liga.

As league champions, Deportivo qualified for the UEFA Champions League for the first time in its history. Their first match was a 1–1 draw against Panathinaikos in Athens. They went on to top their group unbeaten with two wins and four draws. In the second group stage, they also topped their group, and Deportivo were now looking to be one of the strongest teams in the competition. However, in the quarter finals, they lost the first leg 3–0 to Leeds United, and although Depor won the second leg at Riazor 2–0, it was not enough and they were eliminated. The following campaign, they were unbeaten in the first group stage again, including two wins against Manchester United. They progressed out of the second group group stage into the quarter-finals, where they were eliminated by the team they beat twice in the group stage, Manchester United. On 8 September 2001, Deportivo played its 1,000th game in La Liga.

In the 2001–02 season, Depor finished league runner-up to Valencia and won the Copa del Rey for a second time with a 2–1 win against Real Madrid on 6 March 2002. This match is commonly known in Spain as the Centenariazo. Deportivo's opponents were expected to win the final comfortably as they were nicknamed the Galácticos and were among the strongest teams in Europe at the time. Additionally, the final was being played at their home ground, the Santiago Bernabéu. Everything was prepared so that after the expected victory, Real Madrid could celebrate their 100th anniversary by lifting the trophy in front of their own fans. However, Deportivo spoiled the party with a 2–1 win with goals from Sergio and Tristán.

Depor's best Champions League campaign was in the 2003–04 season, where they lost to eventual winners Porto by a narrow 1–0 aggregate scoreline in the semi-finals. Although this was their best Champions League campaign, the club also had its biggest defeat in European competitions, losing 8–3 to Monaco in the group stage. However, this campaign is also remembered for their stunning comeback against Milan in the quarter-finals. Milan won the first leg 4–1 at San Siro, but in the second leg at Riazor, Deportivo won 4–0 and eliminated the defending champions 5–4 on aggregate.

Deportivo had a mediocre 2004–05 season. The team finished eighth in La Liga, only good enough to qualify for the Intertoto Cup. In the Champions League, the club had their worst campaign ever, finishing bottom of their group without winning a single match, and without scoring a single goal. This season ended the club's spell of five consecutive years playing Champions League football.

In the summer of 2005, manager Javier Irureta was replaced by Joaquín Caparrós, ending his seven-year spell at the club.

2008–2014: Transition and Decline 

Deportivo's period in the top flight came to an end as they were relegated after finishing 18th in 2010–11. In July 2015, however, it was suspected that in the final round of matches for that season, Levante and Real Zaragoza were involved in a match-fixing scandal which ensured that the latter won 2–1 at the Estadi Ciutat de València and remained in the division at the expense of Deportivo, who lost 2–0 at home to Valencia. The case was in Courts until December 2020, when the match fixing was discarded by the Provincial Court.

In the 2011–12 season, Deportivo made an immediate return to the top flight, spending half of the season top of the league. Lassad Nouioui was the top scorer with 14 goals, Andrés Guardado the top assistant and Álex Bergantiños the only player to participate in all league matches. They amassed a Segunda División record haul of 91 points and finished in first position.

In the 2012–13 season, Deportivo finished 19th after a turbulent campaign under three managers, and once again were relegated to the Segunda División. Deportivo, however, finished second in the 2013–14 season, guaranteeing promotion to the top-flight for the second time in three years. A less-than-impressive 2014–15 campaign back in the top division with a disjointed squad featured some very poor performances on the pitch under new manager Víctor Fernández, including a humiliating 2–8 reverse at home to Real Madrid. This was especially disappointing considering the impressive 18-match unbeaten home run between 1992–93 and 2010–11 at the Riazor against Madrid, a feat which no other team has managed to achieve in the history of Spanish football. Deportivo ultimately finished the season in 16th place and avoided relegation after appointing former player Víctor Sánchez as manager on 9 April 2015, for the remaining eight matches of the season.

2015–present: "New Dépor" and double relegation

With Víctor Sánchez as their new manager, Deportivo made changes for the new season. With the addition of new players Alejandro Arribas, Fernando Navarro, Pedro Mosquera and Fayçal Fajr, Deportivo began the season with a 0–0 draw against Real Sociedad. On 28 November 2015, with a 2–0 victory against Las Palmas, Deportivo were in fifth place after an impressive start. However, after a disastrous second half of the season, which was precipitated by a 3–0 home defeat to CD Mirandés in the Copa del Rey, Deportivo won only two matches out of the next 22, including an 8–0 humiliation at the hands of Barcelona, and only secured their safety in La Liga in the penultimate game of the season with a victory over Villarreal. Victor Sánchez was sacked on 29 May 2016 after several incidents of player unrest within the squad.

The team continued in a negative spiral in the following seasons. At the end of the 2017–18 season, Deportivo was relegated following a 4–2 home defeat to Barcelona, which also secured the Blaugrana the La Liga title. The next season the club played in Segunda División and finished sixth. In the promotion play-offs, Deportivo lost to Mallorca 3–2 on aggregate and remained in Segunda División. In the following campaign Deportivo was relegated once again, falling down into Segunda División B for the first time in 39 years. They were not able to win the promotion back the following season, finding themselves remaining in the third-tier, in the newly formed Primera División RFEF, for the 2021–22 season.

Identity

Crest
Deportivo's crest contains cues to predecessor Sala Calvet's crest, with a gentlemen's belt encircling the purple and white banner of the gymnasium. The banner itself features a sky blue diagonal band which represents the maritime flag of A Coruña and the Galician flag. In addition, it features a crown which represents its royal patronage (granted in 1909 by Alfonso XIII). During the Spanish Republic (1931–1936) the honorific real (royal) and the crown were removed from the club crest; this was to return under Francoist Spain.

Kit
Deportivo have always played in their famous blue and white stripes, but it was not until 1912 that the club made these colours official for matches. Deportivo continues to wear blue and white striped shirts with blue shorts and socks, yet their second and third kits change annually according to commercial interests. Their current shirt sponsors are local brewery Hijos de Rivera, with Kappa manufacturing the kits. In 2015, Deportivo and Estrella Galicia extended their sponsorship deal throughout the 2015–16 La Liga season with an option of a further year.

Supporters 
Deportivo's supporters are known as deportivistas. Despite playing in the third tier, the club had 25,001 season ticket holders in the 2022–23 season. The supporters organise themselves around 200 supporter groups known as peñas; the most well-known being the "Riazor Blues". The interests of the supporters are represented by the Federación de Peñas RC Deportivo.

Stadium information

Name – Abanca-Riazor
City – A Coruña
Capacity – 32,490
Inauguration – 1944
Pitch size – 105 x 68 m

Players

Current squad

Reserve team

Out on loan

Current technical staff

Coaches

Presidents

Honours

League
 La Liga
 Winners (1): 1999–2000
 Segunda División
 Winners (5): 1961–62, 1963–64, 1965–66, 1967–68, 2011–12
 Tercera División
 Winners (1):  1974–75

Cups
 Copa del Rey
 Winners (2): 1994–95, 2001–02
 Supercopa de España
 Winners (3): 1995, 2000, 2002
 Copa España
 Winners (1): 1912

Regional tournaments
 Campeonato de Galicia
 Winners (6): 1926–27, 1927–28, 1930–31, 1932–33, 1936–37, 1939–40 
 Copa Galicia
 Winners (1): 1945–46

Friendly tournaments
Teresa Herrera Trophy
Winners (24): 1955, 1962, 1964, 1969, 1995, 1997, 1998, 2000, 2001, 2002, 2003, 2004, 2005, 2006, 2007, 2008, 2012, 2014, 2015, 2016, 2017, 2019, 2020, 2022
Runners-up (11): 1966, 1971, 1987, 1991, 1994, 2009, 2010, 2011, 2013, 2018, 2021

Individual trophies
Pichichi (3):
1992–93 – Bebeto (29 goals)
2001–02 – Diego Tristán (21 goals)
2002–03 – Roy Makaay (29 goals) (European Golden Shoe)

Zamora (8):
1941–42 – Juan Acuña
1942–43 – Juan Acuña
1949–50 – Juan Acuña
1950–51 – Juan Acuña
1953–54 – Juan Otero
1992–93 – Francisco Liaño (tied with Santiago Cañizares)
1993–94 – Francisco Liaño
1996–97 – Jacques Songo'o

Statistics

Season-by-season

46 seasons in Primera División
41 seasons in Segunda División
2 seasons in Primera División RFEF
2 seasons in Segunda División B
1 season in Tercera División

Latest seasons

Ke

 Div. = Division
 Pos. = Position
 PL = Games played
 W = Games won
 D = Games drawn
 L = Games lost
 GS = Goals scored
 GA = Goals against
 P = Points

European record

Accurate as of 8 August 2017

Source: UEFA.comPld = Matches played; W = Matches won; D = Matches drawn; L = Matches lost; GF = Goals for; GA = Goals against; GD = Goal Difference.

Player records

Most appearances

Most goals

Former international players

 Fabricio Coloccini
 Aldo Duscher
 Jonás Gutiérrez
 Germán Lux
 Lionel Scaloni
 Haris Medunjanin
 Bebeto
 Djalminha
 Flávio Conceição
 Filipe Luís
 Mauro Silva
 Rivaldo
 Ilian Kiriakov
 Emil Kostadinov
 Jacques Songo'o
 Julian de Guzman
 Stipe Pletikosa
 Bryan Rabello
 Abel Aguilar
 Marlos Moreno
 Celso Borges
 Petr Kouba
 Rodolfo Bodipo
 Dudu Aouate
 Gaku Shibasaki
 Omar Bravo
 Andrés Guardado
 Salaheddine Bassir
 Fayçal Fajr
 Mustapha Hadji
 Noureddine Naybet
 Ryan Babel
 Ola John
 Roy Makaay
 Peter Rufai
 Knut Olav Rindarøy
 Roberto Acuña
 Claudio Morel Rodríguez
 Jorge Andrade
 Ivan Cavaleiro
 Zé Castro
 Hélder Cristóvão
 Hélder Postiga
 Nélson Oliveira
 Pizzi
 Pauleta
 Sílvio
 Cezary Wilk
 Przemysław Tytoń
 Florin Andone
 Dmitri Radchenko
 Amancio Amaro
 Juan Acuña
 Adolfo Aldana
 Álvaro Arbeloa
 Ángel Arizmendi
 Armando Álvarez
 Daniel Aranzubia
 Joan Capdevila
 Pahiño
 Chacho
 Claudio Barragán
 Donato
 Fran
 Alberto Lopo
 Albert Luque
 Javier Manjarín
 Pedro Munitis
 Fernando Navarro
 Álex Bergantiños
 Juanfran Moreno
 Manolete
 Manuel Pablo
 José Francisco Molina
 Nando
 Luis Otero
 Pahiño
 Pedrito
 Enrique Romero
 Sergio
 Diego Tristán
 Juan Carlos Valerón
 José Luis Veloso
 Víctor Sánchez
 Voro
 Christian Wilhelmsson
 Lassad
 Emre Çolak
 Fabián Estoyanoff
 Gustavo Munúa
 Walter Pandiani
 Jonathan Rodríguez
 Miroslav Đukić
 Slaviša Jokanović
 Borče Sredojević

World Cup players
The following players represented their country at the FIFA World Cup while playing for Deportivo.

  Chacho (1934)
  Juan Acuña (1950)
  Mauro Silva (1994) (World Cup winner)
  Bebeto (1994) (World Cup winner)
  Voro (1994)
  Noureddine Naybet (1998)
  Mustapha Hadji (1998)
  Salaheddine Bassir (1998)
  Jacques Songo'o (1998)
  Peter Rufai (1998)
  Diego Tristán (2002)
  Enrique Romero (2002)
  Juan Carlos Valerón (2002)
  Sergio (2002)
  Roberto Acuña (2006)
  Fabricio Coloccini (2006)
  Andrés Guardado (2010)
  Fabian Schär (2018)
  Michael Krohn-Dehli (2018)
  Francis Uzoho (2018)
  Celso Borges (2018)

Deportivo de La Coruña Femenino

Real Club Deportivo de La Coruña Femenino is the women's football section of Deportivo which plays in Spain's Primera Federación.

Honours
 Women's Spanish Cup (unofficial) (2): 1981, 1982
Women's Spanish Cup (3): 1983, 1984, 1985

Deportivo de La Coruña B

Real Club Deportivo Fabril is the reserve team of Deportivo de La Coruña. Founded in 1914 as Fabril Sociedad Deportiva, it plays in Tercera División RFEF – Group 1, the fifth tier of Spanish football. Its stadium is called Cidade Deportiva de Abegondo, with a capacity of 1,000 seats.

In 1993 the team was officially renamed Deportivo B, although most locals still called it "Fabril". In 2017 it was renamed back to Real Club Deportivo Fabril.

See also

Teresa Herrera Trophy

References

External links

 Official website 
 Deportivo de La Coruña at La Liga 
 Deportivo de La Coruña at UEFA 

 
Football clubs in Galicia (Spain)
Copa del Rey winners
Organisations based in Spain with royal patronage
Association football clubs established in 1906
1906 establishments in Spain
La Liga clubs
Segunda División clubs
Primera Federación clubs